The Old Mosque, Ufa, commonly known as the Tukayev Mosque, is located in Ufa, Russia.

The first permanent mosque in the city of Ufa was erected in 1830 on Frolovskaya Street (later renamed Tukayev Street). Its construction was initiated by Gabdesallam Gabdrakhimov (1765-1840), the second mufti of the Orenburg Muslim Spiritual Assembly.  A madrasah was opened in 1887. It was the only active mosque in the city between 1960 and 1994. The local imam Cihangir Abızgildin was arrested and executed by the NKVD in 1937.

See also 
Islam in Russia
List of mosques in Russia
List of mosques in Europe

References 

Religious buildings and structures completed in 1830
19th-century mosques
Mosques in Ufa
1830 establishments in the Russian Empire
Mosques in Russia
Mosques in Europe
Cultural heritage monuments of regional significance in Bashkortostan